The Treaty of Basel of 22 September 1499 was an armistice following the Battle of Dornach, concluding the Swabian War, fought between the Swabian League and the Old Swiss Confederacy.

The treaty restored the status quo ante territorially. Eight out of the ten members in the League of the Ten Jurisdictions were confirmed as nominally subject to the Habsburgs, but their membership in the league and their alliance with the Swiss Confederacy was to remain in place.

Jurisdiction over Thurgau, previously an Imperial loan to the city of Constance, was to pass to the Swiss Confederacy. The imperial ban and all embargoes against the Swiss cantons were to be discontinued.

In 19th-century Swiss historiography, the treaty was presented as an important step towards de facto independence of the Swiss Confederacy from the Holy Roman Empire. In the words of Wilhelm Oechsli (1890), the treaty represented "the recognition of Swiss independence by Germany".
This view has come to be viewed as untenable in 20th-century literature (Sigrist 1949, Mommsen 1958), as there is no indication that the leaders of the Confederacy at the time had any desire to distance themselves from the Empire. Nevertheless, the Confederacy was substantially strengthened as a polity within the Empire by the treaty, and an immediate consequence of this was the accession of Basel and Schaffhausen in 1501, as part of the expansion (1481–1513) from the late medieval Eight Cantons to the early modern Thirteen Cantons.

See also
List of treaties

References

H. Sigrist, "Zur Interpretation des Basler Friedens von 1499", Schweizer Beiträge zur Allgemeinen Geschichte 7, 1949, 153–155.
K. Mommsen, Eidgenossen, Kaiser und Reich, 1958, 11–16.
P. Moraw, "Reich, König und Eidgenossen im späten MA", in Jahrbuch der Historischen Gesellschaft Luzern 4, 1986, 15–33.

1490s treaties
Treaties of the Old Swiss Confederacy
Basel

Swabian War
1490s in the Holy Roman Empire
1499 in Europe
1499